Mejmir (is a village in [[Yurtchi-ye Gharbi, Nir County, Ardabil Province, Iran. At the 2006 census, its population was 193, in 46 families.

References 

Towns and villages in Nir County